East Prawle is a village in Chivelstone parish in the South Hams district of Devon, England. It is situated on the coast south east of Salcombe, near the most southerly tip of Devon, Prawle Point.

Mentioned in the Domesday Book, the village's name comes from the Anglo-Saxon word Præwhyll meaning 'lookout place'. Primarily a farming settlement, the village has seen little major development save to meet local requirements. During the First World War an airfield was constructed just outside the village.

Local amenities include a public house, local shop, and a community hall.

See also
 RNAS Prawle Point

References

External links
Local history society

Beaches of Devon
Villages in South Hams
Headlands of Devon